Bukovci is a settlement in the Municipality of Markovci in northeastern Slovenia. It lies on the regional road from Ptuj to the border with Croatia and on to Varaždin. It was first mentioned in written documents dating to 1322. The area is part of the traditional region of Styria. It is now included with the rest of the municipality in the Drava Statistical Region.

Notable people
Notable people that were born or lived in Bukovci include:
Janez Zemljarič (1928–2022), communist politician

References

External links
Bukovci on Geopedia

Populated places in the Municipality of Markovci